Mondotek is a German electronic dance music band which started its career in France, with members Danny Daagard and Steve Morane. Their most popular hit is "Alive!". They are also known for their remix of One Desire by Jakarta.

Singles

References

External links
 Official website
 MySpace
 Hypetraxx Records

German musical groups